Agustín Creevy (born 15 March 1985 in La Plata) is an Argentine rugby union player. He currently plays for the national Argentina team The Pumas and for London Irish in the Gallagher Premiership. Creevy is the most-capped Argentine rugby player of all-time, having played 98 tests, including 49 as captain, from 2014-2018.

He plays as a hooker, but has also played flanker and was selected for the 2010 June tests against Scotland. His test debut for Argentina was in 2005 when he played against Japan in Buenos Aires.

Creevy is ambassador for Assist Card.

Personal life
Creevy was born in La Plata.

In November 2020, Creevy tributed the passing of Diego Maradona in an interview and also with his team, London Irish, in a game against Leicester where Creevy used a black jersey with the number 10 and name Maradona inscribed on it.

Career
Agustín started his rugby career in the San Luis rugby club, in La Plata, Buenos Aires. He made his Argentina debut aged 20 against Japan in 2005, playing as a flanker, two years later he signed his first professional contract with French Top 14 side Biarritz in 2007. However he played very little in his first season in Biarritz and had gone out of international selection contention soon after his debut for Argentina.

In his second season at Biarritz he played just 20 minutes and suffered a lot from a shoulder injury. During his time injured Argentina coach Santiago Phelan suggested he switched position from flanker to hooker, Creevy requested and was granted an early release from his contract with Biarritz in January 2009 to return to Argentina to adapt to playing his new position.

Remarkably, within months Creevy was selected to play for the Argentina Jaguars a few months later in May 2009 to tour Namibia, and was retained for the 2009 Churchill Cup. He was then selected for the senior Argentina side for the 2009 November tests and replaced Alberto Vernet Basualdo as the Pumas understudy to Mario Ledesma, all in less than a year of playing hooker.

After cementing his status as Argentina's number 2 hooker throughout 2010, Creevy was signed by Clermont as a medical joker for the injured Willie Wepener in October 2010 on recommendation from Mario Ledesma. However he only played 2 minutes during his three-month stay at Clermont, and returned to the Pampas XV in 2011. After the Pampas XV's undefeated campaign he was signed by his third Top 14 side Montpellier.

In 2011, Creevy was captain the Pumas under coach Santiago Phelan, for Argentina's second warm up match against the French Barbarians however it didn't go well for him as Argentina struggled massively at the lineout and lost 21-18. He also captained the Pumas against Worcester. Creevy was selected by Argentina for the 2011 Rugby World Cup and played in all matches off the bench.

Creevy is known as a mobile hooker with some very good ball handling skills for a hooker, his good offloading skills have led him to become called "Sonny Bill" Creevy (after the All Blacks centre Sonny Bill Williams whose trademark is offloading) by some Montpellier fans.

Agustín is part of the Argentina squad that competes in the Rugby Championship, being captain since the 2014 Rugby Championship and until the 2018 Rugby Championship.

He was part of the national team that competed at the 2015 Rugby World Cup and 2019 Rugby World Cup.

In 2016, Creevy received an offer from a club in Ireland before returning to Argentina to play for Jaguares. He returned Argentina with the intention of playing for the Pumas.

In August 2020, he signed a one year contract with Premiership Rugby side London Irish, ahead of the 2020–21 season.

In February 2021, Creevy spoke of the idea of renovating his contract with London Irish, staying in England, and playing in the 2023 World Cup. In the same month, he extended his contract with the club and was joined by compatriot Facundo Gigena, who arrived from Leicester Tigers.

In October 2021, Creevy marked tries in four consecutive games and grew his desire of returning to the Pumas. The tries were against rivals Sale Sharks, Northampton Saints, Leicester Tigers and Gloucester. Creevy, at age 36, also started in the last five games and disputed 286 minutes.

On 7 January 2022, Creevy renewed his contract with London Irish. In January 2022, Creevy was expulsed for London Irish, for head butting opponent, Jamie Ritchie, from Edinburgh in a game for the Challenge Cup. On 19 January, London Irish announced on their website that Creevy's disciplinary outcome was a three-week suspension and that he would be free to play again on 7 February. The disciplinary committee affirmed that the suspension was for six weeks, but good records and no aggravating factors, the suspension was reduced to three weeks.

References

External links
FICHA JUGADOR - UAR - UNIÓN ARGENTINA DE RUGBY
Official RWC 2011 Site - Argentina - Agustín Creevy
scrum.com
rugbyfun.com.ar
islandsportsnews.net

1985 births
Living people
Argentine people of Irish descent
Argentine rugby union players
Rugby union hookers
Argentina international rugby union players
Biarritz Olympique players
Pampas XV players
ASM Clermont Auvergne players
Montpellier Hérault Rugby players
Worcester Warriors players
Jaguares (Super Rugby) players
Sportspeople from La Plata
Argentine expatriate rugby union players
Argentine expatriate sportspeople in France
Argentine expatriate sportspeople in England
Expatriate rugby union players in France
Expatriate rugby union players in England